Antonio Fuertes Pascual (3 December 1929 – 5 January 2015) was a Spanish footballer who played as a midfielder. He played for Valencia and Elche and won one cap for the Spain national team.

References

External links
 

1929 births
2015 deaths
Spanish footballers
Footballers from Valencia (city)
Association football midfielders
Spain international footballers
Valencia CF Mestalla footballers
Valencia CF players
Elche CF players